The Dog in the Manger is a 1978 Soviet musical-comedy film directed by Yan Frid based on the eponymous 1618 play by Lope de Vega.

Plot
Teodoro, secretary of the Countess Diana de Belflère, is in love with the maid Marcella. The lady suddenly feels jealousy awakening in her as she watches the development of their romance. But conventions and burden of prejudice have strong power over the independent and self-willed Diana. She, who teases her noble fiancées, can not go so low as to confess her love to an uncultivated servant. Teodoro has no choice - he has to leave Diana's house and go to seek happiness in some other place although the souls of lovers belong to each other. Then his servant Tristan, a wily and witty scoundrel comes to the rescue. And Teodoro suddenly turns out to be an aristocratic nobleman, not inferior in his ancestry and wealth to Diana.

Cast
Margarita Terekhova - Diana, Countess de Belfleur (vocals: Elena Driatskaya)
Mikhail Boyarsky - Teodoro
Igor Dmitriev - Count Federico (vocals: Mikhail Boyarsky )
Nikolai Karachentsov - Marquis of Ricardo, Diana's suitor
Ernst Romanov - Count Ludovico, Father Teodoro
Elena Proklova - Marcela, Diane's maid and former beloved Teodoro (vocals: Elena Driatskaya)
Armen Dzhigarkhanyan - Tristan, lackey and friend Teodoro (voiced by Igor Efimov, Mikhail Boiarsky sang the couplets of drinking companions)
Victor Ilichev - Fabio, servant of Diana
Zinaida Sharko - Anard, Diana's maid and girlfriend
Gelena Ivlieva - Dorotea, Diana's maid and girlfriend of Marcela
Fyodor Nikitin - Ottavo, Diana's majordomo (voiced by Aleksandr Demyanenko)

Production
Initially, Oleg Yankovsky and Oleg Dahl auditioned for the role of Teodoro, and Mikhail Boyarsky was to play the role of the Marquis of Ricardo, which eventually was played Nikolai Karachentsov.

The film was shot in Livadia Palace, its gardens and in Lenfilm pavilions.

References

External links

1978 films
1978 romantic comedy films
1970s musical comedy films
Films directed by Yan Frid
Soviet television films
Films based on works by Lope de Vega
Films scored by Gennady Gladkov
Soviet films based on plays
Soviet musical comedy films
Soviet romantic comedy films
Russian romantic comedy films
1970s Russian-language films